FC Mozdok (1968–2006) was a Russian football team from Mozdok. It played professionally in 1968–1969 and 1994–2002. Their best result was 6th place in Zone 4 of the Soviet First League in 1969.

Team name history
 1968–1995 FC Iriston Mozdok
 1996–2006 FC Mozdok

External links
  Team history at KLISF

Association football clubs established in 1968
Association football clubs disestablished in 2006
Defunct football clubs in Russia
Sport in North Ossetia–Alania
1968 establishments in Russia
2006 disestablishments in Russia